Jodie Mack (born January 16, 1983 in London, England) is an English-born American experimental filmmaker and animator. She attended the University of Florida and earned her MFA in film, video, and new media at the School of the Art Institute of Chicago and teaches at Dartmouth College. Mack's works have screened at the Viennale, the New York Film Festival, the Toronto International Film Festival, and the Locarno Festival.  Mack is currently a 2017–2018 Radcliffe-Harvard Film Study Center Fellow/David and Roberta Logie Fellow. Mack primarily produces her films using a 16 millimeter Bolex camera.  Mack stated in an interview that "[She] chose to work in film because the material renders color and texture in a way that resonates with a lot of [her] work”.

Many of Jodie Mack's films are stop motion animations that feature everyday fabrics and textiles or recycled materials like magazine clippings or newspaper scraps.

Education 
Mack earned her BA in Film and Media Studies From the University of Florida, graduating Summa cum laude in 2004. She went on to earn her MFA from the School of the Art Institute of Chicago in Film/Video/New Media in 2007.

Professional experience 
After receiving her MFA in 2007, Mack started work at the Television Department at Columbia College Chicago in Chicago, Illinois. From 2008 to 2010 she was an adjunct professor at the College of Digital Media at DePaul University in Chicago. In 2009, Mack also became and adjunct professor of Moving Image at the University of Illinois at Chicago. Since 2010 she has been an Associate Professor of Film and Media Studies at Dartmouth College.

Dusty Stacks of Mom: The Poster Project 
Dusty Stacks of Mom is a 43-minute film made by Jodie Mack in 2013. The film is a documentary/musical performance on her mother's failing rock and roll merchandise business. The film uses the warehouse where the wholesale merchandise was held and distributed. The films stop motion animations are created using many of the posters, postcards, and other materials that were commonplace in her mother's business. These objects were used to create a visual narrative and "psychedelic" stop motion scenes. The film was created as a musical performance and when it was shown at various screenings a live musical performance accompanied the film playing re-written Pink Floyd songs. The film was performed at Rotterdam, RIDM and True/False.

References

Further reading

External links 
 
 

University of Florida alumni
Dartmouth College
1983 births
Living people
American documentary film directors